Hickman Elementary School District is a public school district based in Stanislaus County, California, United States.

External links
 

School districts in Stanislaus County, California